Lypky is a historic neighborhood of the Ukrainian capital Kyiv located in the administrative Pecherskyi District. The name has derived from a lime tree (Lypa). Lypky is the de facto government quarter of Ukraine hosting the buildings of the Verkhovna Rada (Parliament), Presidential Administration and Government; ceremonial residences & hotels traditionally used by politicians.
Lypky became known only recently since the 19th century. During that time it already became known as an elite district. Geographically Lypky is considered to be part of Pechersk (Caves), yet it is located between the Old Kyiv neighborhood (bordering by Khreshchatyk) and the Pechersk neighborhood across the Klov descent and Mechnikov Street.
Streets of Lypky were the scenes of the most bloody episodes of the Euromaidan revolution (2013-2014).

Gallery

Neighborhoods in Kyiv
Pecherskyi District